The 2001 Pepsi 400 Presented by Meijer was the 23rd stock car race of the 2001 NASCAR Winston Cup Series and the 32nd iteration of the event. The race was held on Sunday, August 19, 2001, in Brooklyn, Michigan, at Michigan International Speedway, a two-mile (3.2 km) moderate-banked D-shaped speedway. The race was shortened from its scheduled 200 laps to 162 due to inclement weather. Sterling Marlin, driving for Chip Ganassi Racing with Felix Sabates, would control the late stages of the race when rain stopped the race to win his seventh career NASCAR Winston Cup Series victory and his first victory of the season. The win was also Dodge's first victory in the NASCAR Winston Cup Series in 24 years. To fill out the podium, Ricky Craven, driving for PPI Motorsports, and Bill Elliott, driving for Evernham Motorsports, would finish second and third, respectively.

Background 

The race was held at Michigan International Speedway, a two-mile (3.2 km) moderate-banked D-shaped speedway located in Brooklyn, Michigan. The track is used primarily for NASCAR events. It is known as a "sister track" to Texas World Speedway as MIS's oval design was a direct basis of TWS, with moderate modifications to the banking in the corners, and was used as the basis of Auto Club Speedway. The track is owned by International Speedway Corporation. Michigan International Speedway is recognized as one of motorsports' premier facilities because of its wide racing surface and high banking (by open-wheel standards; the 18-degree banking is modest by stock car standards).

Entry list 

 (R) denotes rookie driver.

Practice

First practice 
The first practice session was held on Friday, August 17, at 11:05 AM EST. The session would last for two hours.

Second practice 
The second practice session was held on Saturday, August 18, at 11:15 AM EST. The session would last for 45 minutes.

Third and final practice 
The final practice session, sometimes referred to as Happy Hour, was held on Saturday, August 18, at 3:00 PM EST. The session would last for one hour.

Qualifying 
Qualifying was held on Friday, August 17, at 3:00 PM EST. Each driver would have two laps to set a fastest time; the fastest of the two would count as their official qualifying lap. Positions 1-36 would be decided on time, while positions 37-43 would be based on provisionals. Six spots are awarded by the use of provisionals based on owner's points. The seventh is awarded to a past champion who has not otherwise qualified for the race. If no past champ needs the provisional, the next team in the owner points will be awarded a provisional.

Two drivers would fail to qualify: David Keith and Buckshot Jones.

Full qualifying results 

*Time not available.

Race results

References 

2001 NASCAR Winston Cup Series
NASCAR races at Michigan International Speedway
August 2001 sports events in the United States
2001 in sports in Michigan